Vasylkivskyi Raion may refer to:
 Vasylkiv Raion, a raion in Kyiv Oblast of Ukraine.
 Vasylkivka Raion, a former raion in Dnipropetrovsk Oblast of Ukraine.